Douglas is an unincorporated community in Olmsted County, Minnesota, United States.  The community is located along 75th Street NW (County 14) near its junction with County Road 3.  Douglas is located within Kalmar Township and New Haven Township.  Nearby places include Oronoco, Rochester, and the Douglas State Trail.  The community is about two miles from the city of Rochester.

It was named for Harrison Douglass, the original owner of the town site. A post office was established at Douglas in 1878, and remained in operation until 1963.

References

Unincorporated communities in Olmsted County, Minnesota
Unincorporated communities in Minnesota